Ardres is a commune in the Pas-de-Calais department in northern France.

Geography
Ardres is located 10.1 mi by rail (station is at Pont-d'Ardres, a few km from Ardres) S.S.E. of Calais, with which it is also connected by a canal (with limited turning space). It is one of three towns that make up Les Trois Pays, or "Three Countries", the other two being Guînes and Licques.

History
Ardes was located next to the Pale of Calais, held by the English from 1346 to 1558, and as a result was an important trading and military post. The 1520 meeting between Henry VIII of England and Francis I of France known as the Field of the Cloth of Gold was held just over the border at the English-controlled town of Balinghem. The town has been an important market for cattle. In June 1546, it was the location of the Treaty of Ardres, an agreement between Henry and Francis that ended the 1542 to 1546 Anglo-French War.

Population
The inhabitants are called Ardrésiens.

Sights
Major tourist attractions at Ardres include the Chapelle des Carmes and the Eglise Notre Dame de Grâce.

There are also some lakes (created when peat was removed) which provide fishing and sailing.

Personalities
 Jean-Marie Dorsenne (1773–1812), a French military commander of the Revolutionary and Napoleonic Wars, was born in Ardres

See also
Communes of the Pas-de-Calais department

References

Sources
 

Communes of Pas-de-Calais